Palonosetron, sold under the brand name Aloxi, is used for the prevention and treatment of chemotherapy-induced nausea and vomiting (CINV). It is a 5-HT3 antagonist.

Palonosetron is administered intravenously, or as a single oral capsule. It has a longer duration of action than  other 5-HT3 antagonists. The oral formulation was approved on August 22, 2008, for prevention of acute CINV alone, as a large clinical trial did not show oral administration to be as effective as intravenous use against delayed CINV. It is on the World Health Organization's List of Essential Medicines.

The oral combination netupitant/palonosetron is approved for both acute and delayed CINV.

Adverse effects
The most common adverse effects are headache, which occurs in 4–11% of patients, and constipation in up to 6% of patients. In less than 1% of patients, other gastrointestinal disorders occur, as well as sleeplessness, first- and second-degree atrioventricular block, muscle pain and shortness of breath. Palonosetron is similarly well tolerated as other 5-HT3 antagonists, and slightly less than placebo.

Interactions 

Palonosetron does not relevantly inhibit or induce cytochrome P450 liver enzymes. There are case reports about serotonin syndrome when the drug is combined with serotonergic substances such as selective serotonin reuptake inhibitors (SSRIs) and serotonin–norepinephrine reuptake inhibitors (SNRIs), two common types of antidepressants.

Pharmacology

Mechanism of action
Palonosetron is a 5-HT3 antagonist, commonly known as a setron. These drugs act by blocking serotonin from binding to the 5-HT3 receptor.

Pharmacokinetics
Orally taken palonosetron is absorbed well from the gut and has a bioavailability of 97%. Highest blood plasma levels are reached after 5.1±1.7 hours, independently of food intake, and plasma protein binding is 62%. 40% of the substance are eliminated in the unchanged form, and a further 45–50% are metabolized by the liver enzyme CYP2D6 and to a lesser extent by CYP3A4 and CYP1A2. The two main metabolites, the N-oxide and a hydroxy derivative, have less than 1% of palonosetron's antagonistic effect and are thus practically inactive.

Palonosetron and its metabolites are mainly (to 80–93%) eliminated via the kidney. Biological half-life in healthy persons was 37±12 hours in a study, and 48±19 hours in cancer patients. In 10% of patients, half-life is over 100 hours. Most other marketed setrons have half-lives in the range of about two to 15 hours.

Chemistry
The infusions and capsules contain palonosetron hydrochloride, which is also a solid. The hydrochloride is easily soluble in water, soluble in propylene glycol, and slightly soluble in ethanol and isopropyl alcohol.

The molecule has two asymmetric carbon atoms. It is used in form of the pure (S,S)-stereoisomer.

References

External links 
 

5-HT3 antagonists
Quinuclidines
Isoquinolines
Hoffmann-La Roche brands
Lactams
World Health Organization essential medicines